Alma Ida Willibalde Maximiliana Karlin (October 12, 1889 – January 14, 1950) was a Slovenian traveler, writer, poet, collector, polyglot and theosophist. She was one of the first European women who alone circled the globe.

Biography
She was born in the Styrian town of Celje (now part of Slovenia) in what was then the Austro-Hungarian Empire as the daughter of Jakob Karlin (1829–1898), a major in the Austro-Hungarian Army, and Wilibalde Miheljak (a.k.a. Vilibalda, 1844–1928), a teacher. Her father died when she was eight years old. Alma grew in a predominately German-speaking milieu, and regarded herself chiefly as Austrian rather than ethnic German or Slovene.

After completing her secondary education in Graz, she traveled to London, where she studied languages. She learned English, French, Latin, Italian, Norwegian, Danish, Finnish, Russian, and Spanish. In the later years, she also studied Persian, Chinese, and Japanese. She also spent six months in Paris, where she attended various languages courses at the Sorbonne. and learned Esperanto.

It was at this time when she started work on her (unpublished) dictionary of ten languages, including Slovene.

At the outbreak of World War I in 1914, Karlin had to move to Sweden and Norway, since she was considered a persona non grata in the United Kingdom for being an Austrian-Hungarian citizen. It was in Scandinavia that she met the Swedish writer Selma Lagerlöf, who was so impressed by Karlin and her writing that she proposed her for a Nobel Prize.

In 1919, she returned home, to Celje, then already part of the Kingdom of Yugoslavia. Almost immediately thereafter, however, she started raising money for another journey. To this purpose, she opened a language school in Celje, where she taught up to ten hours a day, while her spare time was spent in painting and writing. On November 24, 1919, she took off again, this time on a nine-year-long journey around the world. She visited South and North America, the Pacific Islands, Australia, and various Asian countries. The last leg of her journey around the world was India. While she is often regarded as the first European women who travelled solo around-the-globe, she was the second woman to do so, preceded by Ida Pfeiffer.

In January 1928, at the request of her dying mother, Alma Karlin returned home, herself exhausted by physical illness and deep depression. She never traveled again. She devoted most of her time to writing. Around 1934, she started developing a keen interest in the study of theosophy. In the later years, especially during World War II, she became close to Roman Catholicism.

Karlin had chronicled her journey in hundreds of reports published in various magazines and newspapers, including the gazette of the Germans in Celje, the Cillier Zeitung, and the German newspapers Neue Illustrierte Zeitung and Der Deutschen Bergknappe. After her return home, she wrote numerous works of fiction and non-fiction. She wrote in German until the rise of the Nazi German regime, when she abandoned German as an act of protest. In Germany, her books were burned by the regime. She also wrote in English for the English-speaking areas. In 1937–38, the Franco-German journalist and anti-Nazi writer Hans Joachim Bonsack found refuge in her home.

Soon after the Axis invasion of Yugoslavia in April 1941 and the German occupation of Lower Styria, she was arrested and sent to Maribor where she waited for the extradition in Serbia, along with thousands of Slovenes. She was released thanks to the vigorous intervention of her lifetime friend Thea Gamelin. She could return to Celje, where she lived in house arrest. In spring 1944, she decided to escape to the southern Slovenian region of White Carniola, which was controlled by the Slovene partisan resistance. Even though she was severely ill, the Communist-led Partisans did not allow her to fly to the Allied-occupied town of Bari in Southern Italy. Instead, she was transported to Dalmatia where she stayed until the end of the war, when she moved back to Celje. She died of breast cancer and tuberculosis on January 14, 1950, in the village of Pečovnik near Celje and is buried alongside Thea Schreiber Gammelin (1906–1988) in the Svetina churchyard.

Almost inevitably, Karlin also became a collector and ethnologist. Most of the objects she acquired on her journeys she sent home, where she later set up a small private museum. Some of the exhibits are now housed in the Celje Regional Museum. Many of her writings have not yet been published; most of them are kept in the National and University Library of Slovenia and in the Berlin State Library.

Publications by Karlin 
English translations are approximate. Some titles were published in German first, then translated into Slovenian.

Novels 

 Malik (roman), 1932 [Malik]
 Samotno potovanje, 1969 [Solitary Travel]
 The odyssey of a lonely woman (London: Victor Gollancz, 1933)
 Roman o potopu celine, 1936 [A Novel on the Flood of the Continent]
 Moj mali Kitajec: roman iz Kitajske, 1921 [My Little Chinese: a novel from China]
 Mistika Južnega morja, I. del Polinezija, II. del Melanezija-Mikronezija, 1931 [Mysticism of the South Sea. part i: Polynesia. part ii: part of Melanesia-Micronesia]
 Nabobova stranska žena, 1937 [Nabob's side wife]

Novellas 

 Mala Siamka, 1937 [Little Siam]
 Najmlajši vnuk častitljivega I Čaa: novela iz Kitajske, 1948 [The youngest grandson of the venerable I Cha: a novel from China]
 O Joni San: Japonske novele, 2006 [Joni San - Japanese Novels]

Short stories 

 Kupa pozabljenja: dve zgodbi, 1938 [Cup of Forgetting: Two Stories]
 Zmaji in duhovi, 1996 [Dragons and spirits]
 Mala pomlad: tri zgodbe, 1937 [Little Spring: Three Stories]
 Mesečeve solze: zgodba iz Peruja, 1935 [Moon Tears: The Story of Peru]
 Štiri dekleta v vetru usode: Zgodba z Južnega morja, 1936,1939, 1943 [Four Girls in the Wind of Destiny: The Story of the South Sea]
 Svetlikanje v mraku, 1999 [Twinkling at dusk]

Travelogues 

 Doživeti svet, 2006 [To experience the world]

Drama works 

 Kringhausenčani: drama v treh dejanjih, 1918 [Kringhausen: Drama in Three Acts]

Other works 

 Kot ujetnica pri lovcih na glavo na Novi Gvineji, 1960  [As a Captive in the Headhunters of New Guinea]
 Modri mesec, 1997 [Blue Moon]
 Smrtonosni trn, 2006 [Death Thorn] 
 The death-thorn and other strange experiences in Peru and Panama (London: G. Allen & Unwin Ltd, 1934)
The Death-thorn: magic, superstitions, and beliefs of urban Indians in Panama and Peru (Detroit, 1971)
 Angel na zemlji, 1998 [Angel on Earth]
 Doživeti svet, 2006 [Experiencing the World]
 Urok Južnega morja: tragedija neke žene (Im Banne der Sudsee) 1930 , prevod Celje, Mohorjeva družba, 1996 (COBISS) [The Spell of the South Sea: The Tragedy of a Woman]
 Mystik der Südsee : Liebeszauber, Todeszauber, Götterglaube, seltsame Bräuche bei Geburten u.s.w. von Alma M. Karlin Federzeichnungen von A.F. Seebacher (Berlin: Lichterfelde Hugo Bermühler, 1931)
 Into-Yo-Intec, 1934 [Into-Yo-Intec]
 Popotne skice, 1997 [Travel Sketches]
 Pod košatim očesom, 1938  [Under the Bony Eye]
 Moji zgubljeni topoli, 2007 [My Lost Poplars]
 Smrtonosni trn in druge nenavadne zgodbe iz Peruja in Paname (Ljubljana: Mladinska knjiga, 2011)

References

Further reading
 Neva Šlibar: Traveling, Living, Writing From and At the Margins. Alma Maximiliana Karlin and her Geobiographical Books", in: The Politics of Piety, 2004
 Barbara Trnovec. Unlimited travel by Alma M. Karlin: life, work, legacy (Neskončno potovanje Alme M. Karlin: življenje, delo, zapuščina). 2020.
 Jerneja Jezernik. Alma Karlin: A citizen of the world (Alma Karlin: Državljanka sveta). Mladinska knjiga. Ljubljana. 2009.
 Dekleva, Milan. Die Weltbürgerin : Roman über Alma M. Karlin. Klagenfurt. 2017.
 Jesenšek, Vida, Ehrhardt, Horst, Kaloh Vid, Natalia. Sprache und Stil im Werk von Alma M. Karlin = Jezik in slog v delih Alme M. Karlin = Language and style in the work of Alma M. Karlin. University of Maribor. Maribor. 2019.
 Klemenčič, Jakob, Pušavec, Marijan. Alma M. Karlin : svetovljanka iz province : življenjepis v stripu. Forum. Ljubljana. 2015.

External links
 Alma M. Karlin (1889–1950) Virtual Home

1889 births
1950 deaths
20th-century Slovenian women writers
20th-century Austrian women writers
University of Paris alumni
Travelers
Slovenian travel writers
Writers from Celje
Slovenian Theosophists
Slovenian ethnologists
Slovenian women poets
Slovenian poets
Austrian people of Slovenian descent
20th-century travel writers
Women travel writers
Female travelers
20th-century poets
Austrian women anthropologists
Slovenian women anthropologists